The English Schools' Football Association was founded in 1904 and is the governing body of schools' football in England. It is responsible for the running and development of schools competitions and festivals at primary and secondary school age. The ESFA headquarters is in Stafford.

The Football Association (FA) works with ESFA to support high quality, coordinated inter school football competition programmes for all young people. The association run national competitions from under-11 to under-19 age groups. This provides opportunities for young people to have the experience of playing at a higher level by representing their schools in a national recognised competition with all of the finals taking place at professional stadia. In the last few seasons, the ESFA has had finals at the Etihad Stadium, Old Trafford, Anfield, Stamford Bridge, Craven Cottage, Goodison Park, the Hawthorns and even Wembley Stadium.

The ESFA's centenary year was in 2004. England Schoolboys v Rest of World was played at Aston Villa F.C. to celebrate this. The game saw over 10,000 spectators attend.

England Schoolboys and England Schoolgirls
The ESFA also co-ordinate the advancement of players all the way to International level, for England Schoolboys (Under 18) and England Schoolgirls (Under 15) teams. The process for representation follows this pattern; School teams nominate the best few players to go forward for County (or District) trials, from these a County team is formed. The County Schools' Associations will then nominate players to go forward to regional (North, Midlands, South West, South East) trials and from these players an International squad is selected.

The England Schoolboys represent their Country by playing in the Centenary Shield. Teams in the competition include England, Scotland, Wales, Northern Ireland and Republic of Ireland. The Boys also play in friendly matches and in the past they have faced New Zealand, Australia, France and Belgium.

The England Schoolgirls play in the Bob Docherty Cup and the Lloyds TSB Cup. Season 2011/12 was the first time this team was run to help with the development in Girls' Football.

National Schools' Football Week 
Schools' Football Week is a national campaign organised by the English Schools' Football Association encouraging schools' across England to engage in footballing activities. The week runs in the last week of February but had to be postponed until May in 2021 due to the Covid-19 Pandemic. The initiative was first introduced by the ESFA back in 2016 and has grown in stature and participation over the four years since its introduction .The Week includes an initiative called SFW GameOn! with the aim of getting as many school pupils as possible to play on one day creating the worlds biggest football match.  Schools Football Week 2021 saw over 8000 schools register their activity and 105,000 school pupils actively involved in the initiative. 

A highlight from Schools Football Week 2017 was Chris Kamara attending Lymm High School, running some coaching sessions with the pupils and answering the students questions.

National competitions
Here is the list of the main competitions the ESFA is currently running:

 U11 Small Sided Competitions (Boys, Girls, Small Schools & Districts)
 U12 Schools' Cup for Boys
 U12 Indoor 5-a-side Cup for Boys
 U12 Indoor 5-a-side Cup for Girls
 U13 Schools' Cup for Boys
 U13 Schools' Cup for Girls
 U13 Small Schools' Cup for Boys
 U13 Inter Association Trophy
 U14 Inter County Trophy for Boys
 U14 Inter County Trophy for Girls
 U14 Schools' Cup for Boys
 U14 Small Schools' Trophy for Boys
 U15 Schools' Cup for Boys
 U15 Schools' Cup for Girls
 U15 Inter Association Trophy
 U16 Schools' Cup for Boys
 U16 Schools' Cup for Girls
 U16 Inter County Trophy for Boys
 U16 Inter County Trophy for Girls
 U18 Schools' Trophy for Boys
 U18 Schools' Trophy for Girls
 U18 Inter County Trophy for Boys
U18 Super League for Boys 
U18 Super League for Girls

National finals
The National Competitions Department arrange the Final venues throughout the year to ensure that the players who make it to the final are given an experience that they will never forget.

The Final Venues that the ESFA have been to in the past include:

 Accrington Stanley F.C.
 AFC Bournemouth
 AFC Telford United
 Aldershot Town F.C.
 Arsenal F.C.
 Aston Villa F.C.
 Barnsley F.C.
 Birmingham City F.C.
 Bisham Abbey National Sports Centre
 Blackburn Rovers F.C.
 Bolton Wanderers F.C.
 Boston United F.C.
 Brentford F.C.
 Bristol City F.C.
 Bristol Rovers F.C.
 Burton Albion F.C.
 Bury F.C.
 Burnley F.C.
 Cambridge United F.C.
 Carlisle United F.C.
 Charlton Athletic F.C.
 Chelsea F.C.
 Cheltenham Town F.C.
 Chesterfield F.C.
 Cirencester Town F.C.
 Colchester United F.C.
 Coventry City F.C.
 Crystal Palace F.C.
 Dagenham and Redbridge F.C.
 Darlington F.C.
 Derby County F.C.
 Doncaster Rovers F.C.
 Durham City AFC
 Eastleigh F.C.
 Everton F.C.
 Exeter City F.C.
 Fleetwood Town F.C.
 Fulham F.C.
 Hereford United F.C.
 Hull City F.C.
 Ipswich Town F.C.
 Leicester City F.C.
 Leyton Orient F.C.
 Lilleshall National Sports Centre
 Lincoln City F.C.
 Liverpool F.C.
 Luton Town F.C.
 Macclesfield Town F.C.
 Manchester City F.C.
 Manchester United F.C.
 Marine F.C.
 Middlesbrough F.C.
 Millwall F.C.
 Milton Keynes Dons F.C.
 Morecambe F.C.
 Newcastle United F.C.
 Northampton Town F.C.
 Northwich Victoria F.C.
 Norwich City F.C.
 Nottingham Forest F.C.
 Notts County F.C.
 Oldham Athletic F.C.
 Oxford United F.C.
 Plymouth Argyle F.C.
 Port Vale F.C.
 Portsmouth F.C.
 Preston North End F.C.
 Reading F.C.
 Rotherham United F.C.
 Rushden & Diamonds F.C.
 Scunthorpe United F.C.
 Sheffield United F.C.
 Sheffield Wednesday F.C.
 Shrewsbury Town F.C.
 Southampton F.C.
 Stockport County F.C.
 Stoke City F.C.
 Sunderland A.F.C.
 Swansea City A.F.C.
 Swindon Town F.C.
 Torquay United F.C.
 Tranmere Rovers F.C.
 University of Keele
 Walsall F.C.
 Watford F.C.
 Wembley Stadium
 West Bromwich Albion F.C.
 West Ham United F.C.
 Witton Albion F.C.
 Wolverhampton Wanderers F.C.
 Worksop Town F.C.
 Wycombe Wanderers F.C.
 Yeovil Town F.C.

Festivals
The ESFA also host four football festivals each year
 The Durham Festival (Under 13)
 The North Tyneside Festival (Under 11)
 The Jersey Festival (Under 11)
 The Isle of Wight Festival (Under 14)

See also
ESFA Competitions 2003–2004
ESFA Competitions 2004–2005

References

External links
Official website

1904 establishments in England
 
Football governing bodies in England
Football in Staffordshire
Organisations based in Staffordshire
School sport in the United Kingdom
Sports organizations established in 1904
Stafford
Youth football in England